The 352d Bombardment Squadron is an inactive United States Air Force unit.  It was last assigned to the 301st Bombardment Wing, stationed at Lockbourne Air Force Base, Ohio, where it was inactivated on 8 June 1964.

During World War II, the 352d Bombardment Squadron was a B-17 Flying Fortress squadron, assigned to the 301st Bombardment Group, Fifteenth Air Force. It earned two Distinguished Unit Citations. The first in 1943, the second in 1944.

The squadron later earned the Air Force Outstanding Unit Award for the period covering 1 January 1961 to 31 December 1962.

History

World War II
Established as a Boeing B-17 Flying Fortress heavy bombardment squadron in early 1942; trained under Second Air Force.   Flew antisubmarine patrols off the California coast from late May to early June 1942, then over the Mid-Atlantic coast during June–July 1942.

Deployed to European Theater of Operations in August 1942, being assigned to VIII Bomber Command, one of the first B-17 heavy bomb squadrons assigned to England.  Engaged in strategic bombardment operations over Occupied Europe attacking enemy military and industrial targets.  Reassigned to Mediterranean Theater of Operations as part of Operation Torch invasion of North Africa.  Assigned to Twelfth Air Force and operated from desert airfields in Algeria and Tunisia during North African and Tunisian campaign.   Assigned to Northwest African Strategic Air Force during Invasion of Sicily and later Italy in 1943. Allocated to Fifteenth Air Force for strategic bombing of Nazi Germany and occupied Europe.  Attacked enemy targets primarily in the Balkans; Southern France; Southern Germany and Austria from southern Italy;  engaged in shuttle bombing missions to airfields in the Soviet Union during the summer of 1944.

Personnel largely demobilized after German capitulation in May 1945; squadron reassigned to the United States and was programmed for conversion to B-29 Superfortress operations and deployment to Pacific Theater, plans canceled after Japanese capitulation in August 1945.  Aircraft sent to storage and unit inactivated largely as a paper unit in October 1945.

Strategic Air Command

Reactivated in 1946 as a Strategic Air Command Boeing B-29 Superfortress strategic bombardment squadron.  Deployed to Fürstenfeldbruck AB, Germany, July–August 1948; to RAF Scampton, England, October 1948-January 1949; and to RAF Stations Lakenheath and Sculthorpe, May–November 1950 for "show of force" missions in Europe as a result of the Berlin Blockade by the Soviet Union and rising Cold War tensions in Europe.  Squadron deployed to Far East Air Forces in February 1951, flying combat missions over North Korea; attacking strategic industrial and military targets during the Korean War.

Returned to the United States in June 1952 and transitioned to the Boeing B-47 Stratojet with the removal of the B-29 as a combat aircraft from the inventory. Moved to Lockbourne AFB in 1958. Added Electronic Countermeasures as an ancillary mission in 1961.

Unit was inactivated and closed in 1964 with the fleet-wide retirement of the B-47 aircraft.

Lineage
 Constituted as the 352d Bombardment Squadron (Heavy) on 28 January 1942
 Activated on 3 February 1942
 Redesignated 352d Bombardment Squadron, Heavy c. 20 August 1943
 Re-designated 352d Bombardment Squadron, Very Heavy on 5 August 1945
 Inactivated on 15 October 1945
 Activated on 4 August 1946
 Redesignated 352d Bombardment Squadron, Medium on 28 May 1948
 Inactivated on 8 June 1964

Assignments
 301st Bombardment Group, 3 February 1942 – 15 October 1945
 301st Bombardment Group, 4 August 1946 – 16 June 1952 (attached to 301st Bombardment Wing 10 February–20 September 1951, after 20 December 1951)
 301st Bombardment Wing, 16 June 1952 - 8 June 1964

Stations

 Geiger Field, Washington, 3 February 1942
 Alamogordo Army Air Field, New Mexico, 28 May 1942 (operated from Muroc Army Air Base and Lindbergh Field, California,  until 14 June 1942)
 Richmond Army Air Base, Virginia, 21 June–19 July 1942
 RAF Chelveston (AAF-105), England, 19 August 1942
 Tafaraoui Airfield, Algeria, 24 November 1942
 Biskra Airfield, Algeria, 21 December 1942
 Ain M'lila Airfield, Algeria, 16 January 1943
 Saint-Donat Airfield, Algeria, 8 March 1943
 Oudna Airfield, Tunisia, 6 August 1943

 Cerignola Airfield, Italy, 10 December 1943
 Lucera Airfield, Italy,  2 February 1944-July 1945
 Sioux Falls Army Air Field, South Dakota, 28 July 1945
 Mountain Home Army Air Field, Idaho, 17 August 1945
 Pyote Army Air Base, Texas,  23 August–15 October 1945.
 Clovis Army Air Field, New Mexico, 4 August 1946
 Smoky Hill Army Airfield (later Smoky Hill Air Force Base), Kansas,  16 July 1947
 Barksdale Air Force Base, Louisiana, 7 November 1949 – 16 June 1952 (deployed to Kadena Air Base, Okinawa, 10 February 1951 – 16 June 1952)
 Lockbourne Air Force Base, Ohio, 15 April 1958 - 8 June 1964

Aircraft
 Boeing B-17 Flying Fortress, 1942–1945
 Boeing B-29 Superfortress, 1946–1952
 Boeing B-47 Stratojet, 1958-1961
 Boeing EB-47, 1961-1964

See also

 Boeing B-17 Flying Fortress Units of the Mediterranean Theater of Operations

References
 Notes

 Citations

Bibliography

 
 
 

Military units and formations established in 1942
Bombardment squadrons of the United States Air Force
Bombardment squadrons of the United States Army Air Forces